Northridge Academy High School is a public high school located in Northridge, Los Angeles, California, USA.

Overview
Northridge Academy High School is administered by the Los Angeles Unified School District (LAUSD). The school opened as a partnership between LAUSD and California State University, Northridge.

The school contains three academies: Health & Human Development, Arts, Media & Communication, and Careers in Education. 9th grade students "explore" the various academies. The students select one  for focusing for grades 10 through 12.

As of 2010, Western Association of Schools and Colleges accredits the school.

History

The school opened on September 10, 2004 with 614 students in grades 9 and 10 and currently serves approximately 1,070 students in grades 9-12.

Before the school opened, LAUSD referred to the school as Valley New High School #1. The school relieved overcrowding at Monroe, Cleveland High School, and Granada Hills Charter High School.

Northridge Academy does not have its own attendance boundary. Rather, it shares the attendance boundary of four neighboring high schools (Cleveland, Granada Hills Charter High School, Monroe High School, and John F. Kennedy High School). Eighth graders who live in the attendance areas for these schools have the option of applying to attend Northridge Academy.

Northridge Academy maintains a Block Schedule in which students go to 110-minute classes. Students also have a 30-minute Advisory (homeroom).

References

External links

Los Angeles Unified School District schools
High schools in the San Fernando Valley
High schools in Los Angeles
Educational institutions established in 2004
Public high schools in California
Northridge, Los Angeles
2004 establishments in California